Pëllumb Jusufi (born 10 February 1988) is a Croatian-Macedonian football player. The midfielder currently plays for the fourth-tier NK Cres. He is of Albanian descent.

Club career

Childhood and early career
Jusufi was born in Tetovo, SFR Yugoslavia to Macedonian Albanian parents from Pirok. Jusufi started playing football at the age of 7 and was mentored by his father, Isak Jusufi, a former professional footballer. Jusufi and his family moved from Tetovo to Zagreb, Croatia when he was 12 years old. In Croatia, he continued playing football and was eventually scouted by Croatian club NK Dinamo Zagreb in 2000. He started playing in the Dinamo youth team and made his way up the ranks of the club. His success in the youth division got him noticed by the Croatian Football Federation and decided to represent Croatia at youth level ahead of the country of his birth Macedonia and Albania. Whilst representing Croatia at a European football tournament in 2006, interests from Borussia Dortmund and VfB Stuttgart were noted. Jusufi was expected to sign for them, however talks broke down between both parties. Jusufi moved to the second-tier Slovenian side SC Bonifika, where he stayed for the rest of the season playing for the senior team while still being eligible for the youth squad. His impact on the team got him noticed by NK Domzale and he moved there in the summer of 2007.

Domžale
Jusufi played for the then Slovenian champions, NK Domzale. During his time in Slovenia he mainly made his appearance as a substitute off the bench. As he did not get regular first team football, Jusufi left  Domzale for Dinamo Tirana, then Albanian Superliga champions. Jusufi made 2 appearances in the Champions League for NK Domzale, one of them against Dinamo Tirana's local rivals KF Tirana.

Dinamo Tirana
Jusufi played his first match for Dinamo in the Albanian Supercup against Vllaznia Shkodër. He helped Dinamo win by scoring in the 78th minute Jusufi scored twice in twenty appearances for Dinamo and at the end of the season, moved to newly promoted team, KS Kastrioti Kruje.

Kastrioti Kruje
Jusufi stayed in Kruje for one season, keeping Kastrioti Kruje in the top half of the superliga for the first time in the club's history.

Shkëndija
During the winter break of the 2011/2011 season, Jusufi moved to Macedonian Prva liga champions, KF Shkëndija.

FC Jazz 
On 14 August 2013 Jusufi was signed by Finnish third-tier side FC Jazz. The connection between Jusufi and Pori based team was made by the father of Nooralotta Neziri who is a Finnish hurdler of Macedonian Albanian descent. Jusufi made 7 appearances scoring 7 goals for Jazz in 2013 Kakkonen. His team was promoted to Ykkönen after the promotion playoffs against Ekenäs IF.

International career
Jusufi has represented Croatia in every youth level. Jusufi has not represented Croatia at the senior level and is therefore eligible to represent either Albania, Croatia or North Macedonia.

Honours

Club
Dinamo Zagreb
 Youth league Player of the Year: 2003, 2004
 Youth league Best Scorer: 2002, 2003, 2005

Domžale
 Slovenian PrvaLiga: 2007–08

Dinamo Tirana
 Albanian Supercup: 2008

References

Sources

External links
 
 

1988 births
Living people
Sportspeople from Tetovo
Albanians in North Macedonia
Macedonian emigrants to Croatia
Croatian people of Albanian descent
Croatian people of Macedonian descent
Association football forwards
Croatian footballers
Croatia youth international footballers
Croatia under-21 international footballers
NK Domžale players
FK Dinamo Tirana players
KS Kastrioti players
NK Hrvatski Dragovoljac players
HNK Gorica players
FC Vysočina Jihlava players
KF Shkëndija players
FK Tomori Berat players
FC Jazz players
FK Renova players
Musan Salama players
FK Poprad players
Slovenian Second League players
Slovenian PrvaLiga players
Kategoria Superiore players
Croatian Football League players
First Football League (Croatia) players
Czech National Football League players
Macedonian First Football League players
Kakkonen players
Ykkönen players
2. Liga (Slovakia) players
Croatian expatriate footballers
Expatriate footballers in Slovenia
Croatian expatriate sportspeople in Slovenia
Expatriate footballers in Albania
Croatian expatriate sportspeople in Albania
Expatriate footballers in the Czech Republic
Croatian expatriate sportspeople in the Czech Republic
Expatriate footballers in Finland
Croatian expatriate sportspeople in Finland
Expatriate footballers in Slovakia
Croatian expatriate sportspeople in Slovakia